John Richmond (born 1960 in Manchester) is an English fashion designer based in Italy.

Biography

Richmond moved from Manchester to London, then eventually to Milan to pursue his dreams. He graduated in fashion design from Kingston University in 1982, and straight away designed his own collection under his own name, while collaborating with such brands as Armani, Joseph Tricot and Fiorucci.

In 1984 he formed The Richmond-Cornejo label with Ravensbourne graduate Maria Cornejo. Since 1987, Richmond has worked under his own name producing three lines, the main line: John Richmond, second line: Richmond X, and the denim line: Richmond Denim.

His close ties with the rock music fashion industry have led him to dress stars such as Madonna, George Michael, David Bowie, Mick Jagger, Annie Lennox, Axl Rose, Bryan Adams, David A. Stewart, Michael Jackson, Britney Spears, Kim Kardashian, Dita Von Teese, Kate Moss, Kaya Jones, Lukas Menzel, Nico Züchner and also Lady Gaga.

He has collaborated with Iraqi fashion designer Reem Alasadi in London. His daughter Phoenix Richmond, is a new fashion model.

He is younger brother to the less successful designer, David 'Dave' Richmond; the owner and Creative Director of established London based packaging design agency; R Design [Formerly Dave Richmond Associates].

References

External links
John Richmond official web site

English fashion designers
Alumni of Kingston University
High fashion brands
Clothing companies of Italy
Italian brands
Companies based in Milan
1960 births
Living people